In differential topology, the jet bundle is a certain construction that makes a new smooth fiber bundle out of a given smooth fiber bundle. It makes it possible to write differential equations on sections of a fiber bundle in an invariant form. Jets may also be seen as the coordinate free versions of Taylor expansions.

Historically, jet bundles are attributed to Charles Ehresmann, and were an advance on the method (prolongation) of Élie Cartan, of dealing geometrically with higher derivatives, by imposing differential form conditions on newly introduced formal variables.  Jet bundles are sometimes called sprays, although sprays usually refer more specifically to the associated vector field induced on the corresponding bundle (e.g., the geodesic spray on Finsler manifolds.)

Since the early 1980s, jet bundles have appeared as a concise way to describe phenomena associated with the derivatives of maps, particularly those associated with the calculus of variations. Consequently, the jet bundle is now recognized as the correct domain for a geometrical covariant field theory and much work is done in general relativistic formulations of fields using this approach.

Jets

Suppose M is an m-dimensional manifold and that (E, π, M) is a fiber bundle. For p ∈ M, let Γ(p) denote the set of all local sections whose domain contains p. Let  be a multi-index (an m-tuple of non-negative integers, not necessarily in ascending order), then define:

Define the local sections σ, η ∈ Γ(p) to have the same r-jet at p if

The relation that two maps have the same r-jet is an equivalence relation. An r-jet is an equivalence class under this relation, and the r-jet with representative σ is denoted . The integer r is also called the order of the jet,  p is its source and σ(p) is its target.

Jet manifolds
The r-th jet manifold of π is the set

We may define projections πr and πr,0 called the source and target projections respectively, by

If 1 ≤ k ≤ r, then the k-jet projection is the function πr,k defined by

From this definition, it is clear that πr = π  o  πr,0 and that if 0 ≤ m ≤ k, then πr,m = πk,m  o  πr,k. It is conventional to regard πr,r as the identity map on J r(π) and to identify J 0(π) with E.

The functions πr,k, πr,0 and πr are smooth surjective submersions.

A coordinate system on E will generate a coordinate system on J r(π). Let (U, u) be an adapted coordinate chart on E, where u = (xi, uα). The induced coordinate chart (Ur, ur) on J r(π) is defined by

where

and the  functions known as the derivative coordinates:

Given an atlas of adapted charts (U, u) on E, the corresponding collection of charts (U r, u r) is a finite-dimensional C∞ atlas on J r(π).

Jet bundles
Since the atlas on each  defines a manifold, the triples ,  and  all define fibered manifolds. In particular, if is a fiber bundle, the triple   defines the r-th jet bundle of π.

If W ⊂ M is an open submanifold, then

If p ∈ M, then the fiber  is denoted .

Let σ be a local section of π with domain W ⊂ M. The r-th jet prolongation of σ is the map  defined by

Note that , so  really is a section. In local coordinates,   is given by

 Algebraic-geometric perspective 

The direct limit of the sequence of injections given by the canonical inclusions  of sheaves, gives rise to the infinite jet sheaf . Observe that by the direct limit construction it is a filtered ring.

Example
If π is the trivial bundle (M × R, pr1, M), then there is a canonical diffeomorphism between the first jet bundle  and T*M × R. To construct this diffeomorphism, for each σ in  write .

Then, whenever p ∈ MConsequently, the mapping

is well-defined and is clearly injective. Writing it out in coordinates shows that it is a diffeomorphism, because if (xi, u) are coordinates on M × R, where u = idR is the identity coordinate, then the derivative coordinates ui on J1(π) correspond to the coordinates ∂i on T*M.

Likewise, if π is the trivial bundle (R × M, pr1, R), then there exists a canonical diffeomorphism between and R × TM.

Contact structure
The space Jr(π) carries a natural distribution, that is, a sub-bundle of the tangent bundle TJr(π)), called the Cartan distribution.  The Cartan distribution is spanned by all tangent planes to graphs of holonomic sections; that is, sections of the form jrφ for φ a section of π.

The annihilator of the Cartan distribution is a space of differential one-forms called contact forms, on  Jr(π). A one form is a contact form provided its pullback along every prolongation is zero. In other words,  is a contact form if and only if

for all local sections σ of π over M.

The Cartan distribution is the main geometrical structure on jet spaces and plays an important role in the geometric theory of partial differential equations. The Cartan distributions are completely non-integrable.  In particular, they are not involutive.  The dimension of the Cartan distribution grows with the order of the jet space.  However, on the space of infinite jets J∞ the Cartan distribution becomes involutive and finite-dimensional: its dimension coincides with the dimension of the base manifold M.

Example
Consider the case (E, π, M), where E ≃ R2 and M ≃ R. Then, (J1(π), π, M) defines the first jet bundle, and may be coordinated by (x, u, u1), where

for all p ∈ M and σ in Γp(π). A general 1-form on J1(π) takes the form

A section σ in Γp(π) has first prolongation

Hence, (j1σ)*θ can be calculated as

This will vanish for all sections σ if and only if c = 0 and a = −bσ′(x). Hence, θ = b(x, u, u1)θ0 must necessarily be a multiple of the basic contact form θ0 = du − u1dx. Proceeding to the second jet space J2(π) with additional coordinate u2, such that

a general 1-form has the construction

This is a contact form if and only if

which implies that e = 0 and a = −bσ′(x) − cσ′′(x). Therefore, θ is a contact form if and only if

where θ1 = du1 − u2dx is the next basic contact form (Note that here we are identifying the form θ0 with its pull-back  to J2(π)).

In general, providing x, u ∈ R, a contact form on Jr+1(π) can be written as a linear combination of the basic contact forms

where

Similar arguments lead to a complete characterization of all contact forms.

In local coordinates, every contact one-form on Jr+1(π) can be written as a linear combination

with smooth coefficients  of the basic contact forms|I| is known as the order of the contact form . Note that contact forms on Jr+1(π) have orders at most r. Contact forms provide a characterization of those local sections of πr+1 which are prolongations of sections of π.

Let ψ ∈ ΓW(πr+1), then ψ = jr+1σ where σ ∈ ΓW(π) if and only if 

Vector fields

A vector field is called horizontal, meaning that all the vertical coefficients vanish, if  = 0.

A vector field is called vertical, meaning that all the horizontal coefficients vanish, if ρi = 0.

For fixed (x, u), we identify

having coordinates (x, u, ρi, φα), with an element in the fiber TxuE of TE over (x, u) in E, called a tangent vector in TE. A section

is called a vector field on E with

and ψ in Γ(TE).

For fixed (x, u, w), identify

having coordinates

with an element in the fiber  of TJr(π) over (x, u, w) ∈ Jr(π), called a tangent vector in TJr(π). Here,

are real-valued functions on Jr(π). A section

is a vector field on Jr(π), and we say 

Partial differential equations
Let (E, π, M) be a fiber bundle. An r-th order partial differential equation on π is a closed embedded submanifold S of the jet manifold Jr(π). A solution is a local section σ ∈ ΓW(π) satisfying , for all p in M.

Consider an example of a first order partial differential equation.

Example
Let π be the trivial bundle (R2 × R, pr1, R2) with global coordinates (x1, x2, u1). Then the map F : J1(π) → R defined by

gives rise to the differential equation

which can be written

The particular

has first prolongation given by

and is a solution of this differential equation, because

and so  for every p ∈ R2.

Jet prolongation
A local diffeomorphism ψ : Jr(π) → Jr(π) defines a contact transformation of order r if it preserves the contact ideal, meaning that if θ is any contact form on Jr(π), then ψ*θ is also a contact form.

The flow generated by a vector field Vr on the jet space Jr(π) forms a one-parameter group of contact transformations if and only if the Lie derivative  of any contact form θ preserves the contact ideal.

Let us begin with the first order case. Consider a general vector field V1 on J1(π), given by

We now apply  to the basic contact forms  and expand the exterior derivative of the functions in terms of their coordinates to obtain:

The latter requirements imply the contact conditions

The former requirements provide explicit formulae for the coefficients of the first derivative terms in V1:

where

denotes the zeroth order truncation of the total derivative Di.

Thus, the contact conditions uniquely prescribe the prolongation of any point or contact vector field. That is, if  satisfies these equations, Vr is called the r-th prolongation of V to a vector field on Jr(π).

These results are best understood when applied to a particular example. Hence, let us examine the following.

Example
Consider the case (E, π, M), where E ≅ R2 and M ≃ R. Then, (J1(π), π, E) defines the first jet bundle, and may be coordinated by (x, u, u1), where

for all p ∈ M and σ in Γp(π). A contact form on J1(π) has the form

Consider a vector V on E, having the form

Then, the first prolongation of this vector field to J1(π) is

If we now take the Lie derivative of the contact form with respect to this prolonged vector field,  we obtain

Hence, for preservation of the contact ideal, we require

And so the first prolongation of V to a vector field on J1(π) is

Let us also calculate the second prolongation of V to a vector field on J2(π). We have  as coordinates on J2(π). Hence, the prolonged vector has the form

The contact forms are

To preserve the contact ideal, we require

Now, θ has no u2 dependency. Hence, from this equation we will pick up the formula for ρ, which will necessarily be the same result as we found for V1. Therefore, the problem is analogous to prolonging the vector field V1 to J2(π). That is to say, we may generate the r-th prolongation of a vector field by recursively applying the Lie derivative of the contact forms with respect to the prolonged vector fields, r times. So, we have

and so

Therefore, the Lie derivative of the second contact form with respect to V2 is

And so the second prolongation of V to a vector field on J2(π) is

Note that the first prolongation of V can be recovered by omitting the second derivative terms in V2, or by projecting back to J1(π).

Infinite jet spaces
The inverse limit of the sequence of projections  gives rise to the infinite jet space J∞(π). A point  is the equivalence class of sections of π that have  the same k-jet in p as σ  for all values of k. The natural projection π∞ maps  into p.

Just by thinking in terms of coordinates, J∞(π) appears to be an infinite-dimensional geometric object. In fact, the simplest way of introducing a differentiable structure on J∞(π), not relying on differentiable charts, is given by the differential calculus over commutative algebras. Dual to the sequence of projections  of manifolds is the sequence of injections  of commutative algebras. Take now the direct limit  of the 's. It will be a commutative algebra, which can be assumed to be the smooth functions algebra over the geometric object J∞(π). Observe that , being born as a direct limit, carries an additional structure: it is a filtered commutative algebra.

Infinitely prolonged PDEs
Given a k-th order system of PDEs E ⊆ Jk(π), the collection I(E) of vanishing on E smooth functions on J∞(π) is an ideal in the algebra , and hence in the direct limit  too.

Enhance I(E) by adding all the possible compositions of total derivatives applied to all its elements. The submanifold E(∞) of J∞(π) cut out by I is called the infinite prolongation of E.

Geometrically, E(∞) is the manifold of formal solutions of E. A point  of E(∞) can be easily seen to be represented by a section σ whose k-jet's graph is tangent to E at the point  with arbitrarily high order of tangency.

Most importantly, the closure properties of I imply that E(∞) is tangent to the infinite-order contact structure  on J∞(π), so that by restricting  to E(∞) one gets the diffiety , and can study the associated Vinogradov (C-spectral) sequence.

Remark
This article has defined jets of local sections of a bundle, but it is possible to define jets of functions f: M → N, where M and N are manifolds; the jet of f then just corresponds to the jet of the sectiongrf: M → M × Ngrf(p) = (p, f(p))(grf is known as the graph of the function f) of the trivial bundle (M × N, π1, M). However, this restriction does not simplify the theory, as the global triviality of π does not imply the global triviality of π1.

See also
 Jet group
 Jet (mathematics)
 Lagrangian system
 Variational bicomplex

References

Further reading
 Ehresmann, C., "Introduction à la théorie des structures infinitésimales et des pseudo-groupes de Lie."  Geometrie Differentielle, Colloq. Inter. du Centre Nat. de la Recherche Scientifique, Strasbourg, 1953, 97-127.
 Kolář, I., Michor, P., Slovák, J., Natural operations in differential geometry.''  Springer-Verlag: Berlin Heidelberg, 1993.  , .
 Saunders, D. J., "The Geometry of Jet Bundles", Cambridge University Press, 1989, 
 Krasil'shchik, I. S., Vinogradov, A. M., [et al.], "Symmetries and conservation laws for differential equations of mathematical physics", Amer. Math. Soc., Providence, RI, 1999, .
 Olver, P. J., "Equivalence, Invariants and Symmetry", Cambridge University Press, 1995, 

Differential topology
Differential equations
Fiber bundles